KPAO may refer to:

 Palo Alto Airport (ICAO code KPAO)
 KPAO-LP, a defunct low-power television station (channel 22) formerly licensed to Paso Robles, California, United States